The Anguillian passport is a British passport issued to British Overseas Territories citizens with a connection to Anguilla. From 2015, all Anguillian passports are issued by Her Majesty's Passport Office in the United Kingdom.

Passport statement
Anguillian passports contain on their inside cover the following words in English only:

See also 
 Visa requirements for British Overseas Territories Citizens

References

External links
Official website of the Anguilla Passport Office

Anguilla
British passports issued to British Overseas Territories Citizens
Anguillan law